The St. Anthony Foundation is a nonprofit social service organization in San Francisco, California. They are best known for their operation of the St. Anthony Dining Room in the Tenderloin District.  It was founded in 1950 by Franciscan friar Alfred Boeddeker to serve free meals to the poor in an ordinary restaurant-like setting. The Dining Room has served as many as 2,500 plates of food a day, and over thirty seven million meals since its creation. The foundation operates a residential drug and alcohol treatment program for men, the Father Alfred Center, whose residents provide volunteer labor for the Dining Hall. Other social services are provided. Local political figures honoring the foundation include Representative Nancy Pelosi, who served the thirty five millionth meal in 2009. The Foundation's dining hall is scheduled to move to a new building in 2012.

References

Charities based in California
Homelessness charities
Organizations established in 1950
Social welfare charities
Non-profit organizations based in San Francisco
1950 establishments in California
Food and drink in the San Francisco Bay Area